A frequency counter is an electronic instrument, or component of one, that is used for measuring frequency. Frequency counters usually measure the number of cycles of oscillation, or pulses per second in a periodic electronic signal. Such an instrument is sometimes referred to as a cymometer, particularly one of Chinese manufacture.

Operating principle
Most frequency counters work by using a counter which accumulates the number of events occurring within a specific period of time. After a preset period known as the gate time (1 second, for example), the value in the counter is transferred to a display and the counter is reset to zero. If the event being measured repeats itself with sufficient stability and the frequency is considerably lower than that of the clock oscillator being used, the resolution of the measurement can be greatly improved by measuring the time required for an entire number of cycles, rather than counting the number of entire cycles observed for a pre-set duration (often referred to as the reciprocal technique). The internal oscillator which provides the time signals is called the timebase, and must be calibrated very accurately.

If the event to be counted is already in electronic form, simple interfacing to the instrument is all that is required. More complex signals may need some conditioning to make them suitable for counting. Most general purpose frequency counters will include some form of amplifier, filtering and shaping circuitry at the input. DSP technology, sensitivity control and hysteresis are other techniques to improve performance.  Other types of periodic events that are not inherently electronic in nature will need to be converted using some form of transducer. For example, a mechanical event could be arranged to interrupt a light beam, and the counter made to count the resulting pulses.

Frequency counters designed for radio frequencies (RF) are also common and operate on the same principles as lower frequency counters. Often, they have more range before they overflow. For very high (microwave) frequencies, many designs use a high-speed prescaler to bring the signal frequency down to a point where normal digital circuitry can operate. The displays on such instruments take this into account so they still display the correct value. Microwave frequency counters can currently measure frequencies up to almost 56 GHz. Above these frequencies the signal to be measured is combined in a mixer with the signal from a local oscillator, producing a signal at the difference frequency, which is low enough to be measured directly.

Accuracy and resolution

The accuracy of a frequency counter is strongly dependent on the stability of its timebase. A timebase is very delicate like the hands of a watch, and can be changed by movement, interference, or even drift due to age, meaning it might not "tick" correctly. This can make a frequency reading, when referenced to the timebase, seem higher or lower than the actual value. Highly accurate circuits are used to generate timebases for instrumentation purposes, usually using a quartz crystal oscillator within a sealed temperature-controlled chamber, known as an oven controlled crystal oscillator or crystal oven.

For higher accuracy measurements, an external frequency reference tied to a very high stability oscillator such as a GPS disciplined rubidium oscillator may be used. Where the frequency does not need to be known to such a high degree of accuracy, simpler oscillators can be used. It is also possible to measure frequency using the same techniques in software in an embedded system. A central processing unit (CPU) for example, can be arranged to measure its own frequency of operation provided it has some reference timebase to compare with.

Accuracy is often limited by the available resolution of the measurement. Resolution of a single count is generally proportional to the timebase oscillator frequency and the gate time. Improved resolution can be obtained by several techniques such as oversampling/averaging.

Additionally, accuracy can be significantly degraded by jitter on the signal being measured. It is possible to reduce this error by oversampling/averaging techniques.

I/O Interfaces
I/O interfaces allow the user to send information to the frequency counter and receive information from the frequency counter. Commonly used interfaces include RS-232, USB, GPIB and Ethernet. Besides sending measurement results, a counter can notify the user when user-defined measurement limits are exceeded. Common to many counters are the SCPI commands used to control them. A new development is built-in LAN-based control via Ethernet complete with GUI's. This allows one computer to control one or several instruments and eliminates the need to write SCPI commands.

See also
 Frequency meter

References

External links

 Agilent's AN200: Fundamentals of electronic frequency counters 12
LCD Frequency Counter 
How to build your own Frequency Counter

Digital electronics
Counting instruments
Electronic test equipment